Jacqueline Pearce (20 December 1943 – 3 September 2018) was a British film and television actress. She was best known for her portrayal of the principal villain Servalan in the British science fiction TV series Blake's 7 (1978–1981), a performance which her obituarist in The Times wrote produced "a sexual awakening for a generation of sci-fi fans".

Pearce studied at both the Royal Academy of Dramatic Art and at the Actors Studio. After early roles in two Hammer horror films, The Plague of the Zombies and The Reptile, she played opposite Jerry Lewis in Don't Raise the Bridge, Lower the River. On stage, she acted in Otherwise Engaged, directed by Harold Pinter, and in Tom Stoppard's Night and Day, and she had numerous television, theatre and audio roles, including in Doctor Who.

She suffered from clinical depression during periods of her life, which she discussed in her memoir, From Byfleet to the Bush (2012). Pearce spent five years working at the Vervet Monkey Foundation in South Africa, before returning to the UK in 2015.

Early life
Jacqueline Pearce was born in Byfleet, Surrey, on 20 December 1943. She grew up spending time both living at her father's home in Byfleet and with a foster family, after her mother had left when Pearce was 16 months old. She attended the Marist Convent School for Girls at West Byfleet, where one of the teachers encouraged her to pursue her ambition of acting, and after leaving school, Pearce successfully auditioned for the Royal Academy of Dramatic Art (RADA).

Career
After graduating from RADA in 1963, Pearce made her television debut in the series A Question of Happiness, in which she played a waitress in the episode "Watch Me I'm a Bird", alongside her RADA contemporaries Drewe Henley, Ian McShane and John Hurt. In the same year, she flew to Yugoslavia to film a short appearance for the film Genghis Khan. She later appeared in minor roles in Danger Man and in Sky West and Crooked, where McShane played a character who was her boyfriend. In Spring 1965, she auditioned for Anthony Nelson Keys at Bray Studios, and won leading roles in two Hammer horror films, The Plague of the Zombies and The Reptile. These were filmed one after another on the same location and both released in 1966.

She married Henley in 1963, after they met when he directed her in a short film while they were at RADA. She divorced him in 1967 after he left her for Felicity Kendal. Pearce left for America in 1967 following her divorce and stayed there until 1971. She worked for Sammy Davis Jr., answering his fan mail, and trained at Lee Strasberg's Actors Studio in Los Angeles. In 1974, she appeared in the role of Rosa Dartle in the BBC dramatisation of Charles Dickens' David Copperfield (1974). In a 1975 television version of Christopher Hampton's stage play The Philanthropist, Pearce played Araminta. The show was criticised by Ann Sheldon Williams of The Stage, who felt that the production was not appropriate for a transfer to television as it should rely on some distancing from the audience, but felt that Pearce's performance "had the right  blend of softness and predatoriness".

Pearce remains best known for her role as Servalan, the principal villain in the British science fiction TV series Blake's 7 (1978–1981). The character was originally written for one episode, but was expanded to a regular role over four series due to Pearce's popularity. Initially the "Supreme Commander", the character later became "President", and is cited by film and television scholar Steven Duckworth as one of the characters that develops significantly during the programme, which he regards as particularly notable as she is a villain. Duckworth also opines that Servalan "offers a potentially empowering female character through her transgression of established gender binaries, this nonconformity is closely bound up with her role as the show's primary villain". Pearce had her hair cropped short when auditioning for the role, and was asked by the producers to keep it short. She influenced the production team to dress her character in feminine clothes rather than the military uniform that they had suggested. Pearce reprised the role in a 90-minute play entitled The Sevenfold Crown on BBC Radio 4 in 1998, alongside several other original Blake's 7 cast members.

She said of Servalan that "I saw her as a woman who was very damaged and driven by pain ... what drove her was not a desire to be evil but a desire to escape from pain." In a 2000 interview for The Observer, Pearce said that, given her own low self-esteem, the role had affected her personal life for years, as she had been attracted to the character's power and taken on some aspects of Servalan's personality, telling the interviewers that it had taken "the best years of my life to recover from Servalan".

The Aberdeen Press and Journal reviewer Tom Lynch referred to Pearce as Servalan as "one of telly's finest baddies". Roy West of the Liverpool Echo felt that "Amid a number of nebulous performances, [Pearce is] a shining star." Historian Dominic Sandbrook wrote in his Who Dares Wins: Britain, 1979–1982 (2019) that "Played with scenery-chewing relish by Jacqueline Pearce, Servalan is at once immensely glamorous and thoroughly evil" and drew a parallel with UK Prime Minister Margaret Thatcher, who took office in 1979, in that both were "perfectly happy to exploit [their] femininity". Vanessa Thorpe and Jakki Phillips said in The Observer in 2000 that "she was the evil genius who haunted the dreams of adolescent boys. With her pathological lust for power and low voice, early encounters with Servalan, the arch-villainess of the BBC sci-fi series Blake's Seven, are remembered as formative experiences by many who were young in the Seventies." Pearce's obituary in The Times stated that her performance provoked "a sexual awakening for a generation of sci-fi fans".

Other film roles include the Carry On film Don't Lose Your Head (1966), White Mischief (1987), How to Get Ahead in Advertising (1989), and Princess Caraboo (1994). In Don't Raise the Bridge, Lower the River (1968) she played opposite Jerry Lewis in his first non-Hollywood film. Pearce told an interviewer in 1981 that as the film had been a commercial failure, it had not helped her career. She appeared as an associate of the assassin Carlos in the television movie, The Bourne Identity (1988). She also acted  in theatre, including Otherwise Engaged, directed by Harold Pinter.

As well as appearing in the BBC children's programmes Dark Season (alongside Kate Winslet) and Moondial, Pearce appeared in the Doctor Who serial The Two Doctors (1985) as Chessene, a bloodthirsty alien, taking the role at short notice after Elizabeth Spriggs had left the production. She was later associated with Doctor Who again through her appearances in The Fearmonger as Sherilyn Harper, an audio drama by Big Finish Productions, and as Admiral Mettna in the webcast story Death Comes to Time. Pearce returned to Doctor Who in 2015, this time opposite Hurt, as a regular in the Big Finish audio series based on the adventures of the War Doctor, portraying Cardinal Ollistra, a leader of the Time Lords in the Time War. Pearce also made guest appearances in TV series such as The Avengers, Public Eye, Callan, Dead of Night, Special Branch, Spy Trap, and The Young Indiana Jones Chronicles.

In 1980 Pearce played Ruth on stage in Tom Stoppard's Night and Day, a performance that Ann Fitzgerald in The Stage praised as she felt that Pearce had "an enviable range of tone and mood at her command". For the 1984/85 pantomime season, Pearce appeared in Cinderella at the Gaumont Theatre, Southampton, alongside Doctor Who actors Colin Baker, Mary Tamm, Anthony Ainley and Nicola Bryant. Pearce and her fellow Blake's 7 actor Paul Darrow (Avon) were voice actors for the 1996 videogame Gender Wars.

Her obituarist in The Daily Telegraph wrote that Pearce possessed "considerable depth and emotional range" which "was not often exploited", whilst her obituary in The Times read that "She could and should have achieved so much more. At Rada she was considered one of the most promising thespians of her generation by contemporaries such as Anthony Hopkins and John Hurt" but that her mental illness had "blighted her career".

Personal life
Pearce suffered from clinical depression during periods of her life. She recounted in her memoir what she regarded as a profound personal and spiritual renaissance while volunteering at the Vervet Monkey Foundation in South Africa, where she had gone for a short stay, but ended up staying five years. She described "the joy of family which hadn't proved possible with human beings". Paul Owens of Starburst praised the book, which he described as a "tortured, agonized memoir of a woman battling with insecurity, mental illness, poverty, homelessness and disillusionment".

In addition to her marriage to Drewe Henley, from 1963 until their divorce in 1967, Pearce was married a second time, which also ended in divorce. Pearce returned to the UK in 2015. She was diagnosed with lung cancer in August 2018 and died on 3 September 2018 at her home in Lancashire.

Filmography

Television

Film

Theatre

References

External links

1943 births
2018 deaths
Alumni of RADA
English radio actresses
English film actresses
English stage actresses
English television actresses
People from Byfleet
Actresses from Lancashire
Deaths from lung cancer in England